is a Japanese manga series written and illustrated by Harold Sakuishi. It was serialized in Shogakukan's seinen manga magazine Weekly Big Comic Spirits from December 2009 to November 2011, with its chapters collected in six tankōbon volumes. A sequel, titled Seven Shakespeares: Non Sanz Droict, started in Kodansha's Weekly Young Magazine in December 2016.

Plot 
This is a historical manga centered around William Shakespeare's "lost years" before becoming a playwright and poet.

Publication
Seven Shakespeares is written and illustrated by Harold Sakuishi. The manga was serialized in Shogakukan's Weekly Big Comic Spirits from December 21, 2009 to November 14, 2011.<ref></p></ref><ref></p></ref> Shogakukan collected its chapters in six tankōbon volumes, released from May 28, 2010 to December 28, 2011. Kodansha republished the series in three volumes, released from July 6 to September 6, 2017.<ref></p></ref>

A sequel, titled , started in Kodansha's Weekly Young Magazine on December 12, 2016. In April 2020, Sakuishi announced that the series would enter on an indefinite hiatus. Kodansha has collected its chapters into individual tankōbon volumes. The first volume was released on April 6, 2017. As of August 5, 2020, thirteen volumes have been released.

In North America, the series is published digitally in English by Comixology and Kodansha USA since July 2018.

Volume list

Seven Shakespeares

Seven Shakespeares: Non Sanz Droict

References

External links
 

Cultural depictions of William Shakespeare
Historical anime and manga
Kodansha manga
Seinen manga
Shogakukan manga
Theatre in anime and manga